A list of films produced in the United Kingdom in 1957 (see 1957 in film):

1957

See also
 1957 in British music
 1957 in British television
 1957 in the United Kingdom

References

External links
 

1957
Films
Lists of 1957 films by country or language